Gudiyam Caves are rock shelters in South India and known for prehistoric stone tools and culture. They were first identified by British geologist Robert Bruce Foote. This ancient site is situated in the Thiruvallur district near the Poondi reservoir,  from Chennai, Tamil Nadu.

Archaeological evidence suggests that the caves were used by Paleolithic Man.  The site has been excavated by the Archaeological Survey of India in 1963 and 1964. Systematic paleolithic studies in this region indicate these sites suggest extensive movement of early hominids across the landscape about 200,000 years ago. Sixteen such shelters have been identified by the Archaeological Survey of India in Allikulli Hill ranges near Poondi.

References

External links
 Archaeological Survey of India
 Tamilnadu Archaeological department
 Documentary Movie

Caves of Tamil Nadu
Rock shelters
Archaeological sites in Tamil Nadu
Tiruvallur district